Bombardier Henry Herbert Reed GC (1911 – 20 June 1941), of No. 2 Battalion, 1 Maritime Anti-Aircraft Regiment, Royal Artillery, was posthumously awarded the George Cross for the "gallant and utterly selfless action" he showed after the merchant ship SS Cormount was attacked by German E-boats and planes on 20 June 1941.

20 June 1941
The ship was raked by machine-gun fire from the attacking planes, and Reed, who had volunteered to man anti-aircraft guns on merchant shipping, had suffered a mortal stomach wound.  Despite his injuries, he rescued the injured Chief Officer from the badly damaged bridge and carried him down two sets of ladders to safety.  He also managed to move an injured steward to cover before dying minutes later of his wounds. The ship survived the attack, despite being struck by an air-launched torpedo.

He was also posthumously awarded the Lloyd's War Medal for Bravery at Sea.

George Cross citation
Reeds' George Cross citation appeared in the London Gazette on 23 September 1941:

Gunner Reed's George Cross is currently held by the National Army Museum in Chelsea, London.

References

Royal Artillery soldiers
People from Sunderland
British recipients of the George Cross
British Army personnel killed in World War II
1911 births
1941 deaths
Military personnel from County Durham